Phillip Stanley Roberts (born 24 February 1950) is a Welsh former professional footballer whose four-club career spanned three decades. Born in Cardiff, Roberts won six Wales Under 23 caps  whilst with his first club Bristol Rovers (where he is still widely regarded
). In all Roberts was to make 175 appearances for Rovers before moving to Portsmouth in the 1973 close season as part of new chairman John Deacon's ambitious re-building plans. He was to prove such an effective player on the south coast that in 1974 he was awarded four full Welsh caps. Roberts was to hold the right back spot at Fratton Park for four seasons, his final appearance being in the 5–1 thrashing which consigned the club to fourth division football for the first time in their history. A very brief spell with Hereford United followed before another 100-plus stint with Exeter City ended a successful Football League career.

References

1950 births
Living people
Footballers from Cardiff
Welsh footballers
Wales international footballers
Wales under-23 international footballers
Association football defenders
Bristol Rovers F.C. players
Portsmouth F.C. players
Hereford United F.C. players
Exeter City F.C. players
Taunton Town F.C. players
Yeovil Town F.C. players
Ottery St Mary A.F.C. players
Weymouth F.C. players
Chard Town F.C. players
English Football League players
National League (English football) players